John Francis Rague (1799–1877; pronounced ra-gu) was a mid-19th century architect who designed and built numerous public buildings including the 1837 Old Capitol of Illinois and the 1840 Territorial Capitol of Iowa. He was born on March 24, 1799 in Scotch Plains, New Jersey. He studied under Minard Lafever in New York, and moved to Springfield, Illinois in 1831. While there, he designed both the Illinois and Iowa capitol buildings, the Tinsley Dry Goods Building and many Greek Revival homes.  In Springfield, Rague was a friend of Abraham Lincoln, and suggested Lincoln wear white gloves to dinner parties.  Lincoln followed this recommendation.

Rague moved to Milwaukee, Wisconsin where he is known for designing the Phoenix Building in Milwaukee, as well as the original portions of Bascom Hill, including Bascom Hall, North Hall and South Hall at the University of Wisconsin-Madison. In 1854, Rague moved to Dubuque, Iowa. While there, he designed a number of buildings, including the city hall, Central Market House, the jail and many homes such as the Mathias Ham and the Langworthy Octagon House. Rague's style varied widely over his career from Neoclassical to Federalist to Late Victorian and even to Egyptian Revival.

Gallery of Rague-designed buildings

References

1799 births
1877 deaths
Architects from Iowa
Architects from Illinois
People from Dubuque, Iowa
Architects from Milwaukee
People from Scotch Plains, New Jersey
19th-century American architects